The 1987 Coca-Cola PBA/IBA World Challenge Cup was the one-week special tournament put together by the Philippine Basketball Association (PBA) and the newly formed league in the United States for players standing 6'4" and below called International Basketball Association (IBA). The one-week event took place from September 20–27 and features PBA teams along with an IBA Selection in a four-team field.

Tournament details
Sponsored by Coca-Cola Bottlers Inc., the first staging had the top three PBA teams in the All-Filipino Conference; Champion Great Taste Instant Milk (formerly Great Taste Coffee), Runner-up Hills Bros Coffee Kings and third placer San Miguel Beer (formerly Magnolia), qualified in the said tournament, together with the IBA All-Stars, coach by Ted Owens, noteworthy of that selection includes future PBA imports "Sugar" Ray Hall and Sean Chambers, Russell Brown, a backcourt star from Arizona State University, and Sam Smith. PBA teams were allowed two imports each, from Great Taste Instant Milk; Dexter Shouse, on loan to Shell, and Dwight Moody, San Miguel Beer;  Bobby Parks and Dwayne Polee, and Hills Bros. Coffee Kings; Alexander Adams and McKinley Singleton.

Results

Note: Great Taste, San Miguel and the IBA Selection finished with identical 2-1 won-loss slates, despite the Beermen's 55-point winning margin over Hills Bros, the quotient system says San Miguel has to win over the IBA stars by at least 8 points. Great Taste and IBA All-Stars played in a one-game finale.

Battle for third place

Finals

Ray Hall of the IBA Selection was named the Most Valuable Player of the PBA/IBA Challenge Cup.

Slam Dunk contest
A sideshow event in the PBA/IBA series was the Kiwi Sneaker Champoo Slam Dunk Competition. In the final round, Sean Chambers of the IBA All-Stars, romped off with the P 50,000 top pot, outjumping the legendary Billy Ray Bates of Ginebra San Miguel, 28-25, who missed his last dunk, a two-handed reverse slam, placing third on the three judges scores was Bobby Parks of San Miguel Beer.

References

 

PBA special conferences
IBA
1987–88 in American basketball
International basketball competitions hosted by the Philippines